The 41st Merdeka Tournament were played from the 4th to 15 September 2013. 
Malaysia Under-23 team earned a huge boost ahead of December’s Sea Games when they edged Myanmar 2-0 in the final. It was Malaysia’s 12th title in Asia’s oldest tournament (overall until this year edition), with the second title specifically for the Under-23 side, since its inception in 1957.

Teams
The participating teams are mostly Under-23 squads preparing for the 2013 SEA Games. Jordan have withdrawn from Merdeka Tournament in Kuantan and the FA of Malaysia has invited Myanmar as the replacements.

 replace 

 Thailand Selected

Stadiums

Tournament

Group stage
Times listed are UTC+8.

3rd/4th Place

Final

Winners

Goalscorers
3 goals
 Rozaimi Abdul Rahman

1 goal

 Junior Eldstål
 Mohd Irfan Fazail
 Mohd Nasir Basharuddin
 Thamil Arasu Ambumamee
 Wan Zack Haikal
 Kyaw Ko Ko
 Kyaw Zayar Win
 Nay Lin Tun
 Soe Kyaw Kyaw
 Faris Ramli
 Shahfiq Ghani
 Chayawat Srinawong
 Hasan Maeroh
 Pakorn Prempak

Team statistics
This table shows all team performance.

References

External links
 Merdeka Tournament Official Website

2013
2013 in Malaysian football
2013 in Singaporean football
2013 in Thai football
2013 in Burmese football
Mer